Crosby is an unincorporated community in Houston County, Alabama, United States.

History
Crosby was most likely named for John Crosby, who served as the first postmaster. A post office operated under the name Crosby from 1886 to 1934.

References

Unincorporated communities in Houston County, Alabama
Unincorporated communities in Alabama